H-E-B Park is a soccer-specific stadium in Edinburg, Texas. It serves as the home of Rio Grande Valley FC Toros of the USL Championship, the second level of the US/Canadian professional soccer pyramid. Rio Grande Valley Football Club is affiliated with the Houston Dynamo, of Major League Soccer. The stadium has two stands with orange seats covered with a roof and a capacity of 9,735.

The stadium was originally intended to be complete before the 2016 USL season. Toros played C.F. Monterrey from Mexico on March 22, 2017 to inaugurate their new stadium. The Toros lost their exhibition match against Rayados 3–0 before a sellout crowd.

References

External links
 
 Stadium pictures at StadiumDB.com

Houston Dynamo FC
Soccer venues in Texas
USL Championship stadiums
2017 establishments in Texas
Sports venues completed in 2017